Mamba's Diamond is a 2021 Nigerian action comedy heist film written by Darlington Abuda and directed by Seyi Babatope. The film stars Osas Ighodaro, Gabriel Afolayan and Uchemba Williams in the lead roles. The film is based on a story of couple of amateur thieves who by accidentally steal diamond which is one of the most valuable precious jewels in the world. The film had its theatrical release on 19 March 2021.

Cast 

 Osas Ighodaro as Eloho
 Gabriel Afolayan as Elenu
 Uchemba Williams as Obi
 Nse Ikpe-Etim as Mamba
 Ayo Makun
 Dibor Adaobi Lilian

Production 
The film project marked Uchemba Williams's debut film as producer and bankrolled the film under his production banner Williams Uchemba Productions. The principal photography of the film began in February 2021 and portions of the film were predominantly shot at a real diamond mine in Johannesburg, South Africa. It was revealed that the stunt sequences for the film were choreographed by Olukiran Babatunde Olawale in October 2020.

References

External links 

 

English-language Nigerian films
Nigerian action comedy films
2021 action comedy films
2020s heist films
Films shot in South Africa
2020s English-language films